The Crucey Solar Park is a 60 MW solar farm in France. It was built by EDF Énergies Nouvelles  in the communes of Maillebois, Crucey-Villages, and Louvilliers-lès-Perche. It has 741,150 thin-film photovoltaics panels made by First Solar.

See also 

Photovoltaic power station
List of photovoltaic power stations

References 

Photovoltaic power stations in France

fr:Dreux-Louvilliers Air Base